Michael Hemmingson (July 12, 1966 – January 9, 2014) was a novelist, short story writer, literary critic, cultural anthropologist, qualitative researcher, playwright, music critic and screenwriter. He died in Tijuana, Mexico on 9 January 2014. The reported cause was cardiac arrest.

Publishing history

As an independent scholar, Hemmingson wrote the meditation, Gordon Lish and His Influence on Twentieth Century American Literature a short TV studies monograph on Star Trek (Wayne State Univ. Press), and an ethnographic research project, Zona Norte (Cambridge Scholars). At the time of his death he was working on a biography of Raymond Carver, set for publication in 2014 by McFarland & Company.

Hemmingson was a prolific writer, often publishing 2-3 books a year. According to one reviewer, "Hemmingson has written over fifty books, and his experience shows. Not only does he inform the stories in This Other Eden with tangible details of the publishing industry, but he also imbues his characters with personalities that are displayed through his skillful use of highly individualized dialogue for each person."

He was a staff writer at the San Diego Reader from November 2004 through January 2014. The last public article he wrote for the San Diego Reader was a critical music review of the rookie project, Million Dollar Mixtape  by San Diego recording artist The Toven released in 2012. The review was published by the San Diego reader on January 6, 2014  just three days before his death on January 9, 2014. For the Many of the photos that accompany his articles there were taken by San Diego's iconic brand photographer, Chris Morrow. In 2010 he joined the staff of Pacific San Diego Magazine.

Film
As a screenwriter, his first indie feature, The Watermelon, was directed by Brad Mays and produced by Lorenda Starfelt at LightSong Films.

He wrote the screenplay for the 2007 film Aliens, based on a one act play. Maxim Dashkin produced and directed.

Real Ideas Studio produced a short documentary, "Life in Zona Norte," that was screen at Cannes Film Festival's Short Film Corner May, 2009.

Awards and honors
Hemmingson won the San Diego Book Awards Association's first Novel-in-Progress grant for The Rose of Heaven and SDBAA's Best Published novel for Wild Turkey. His media study monograph, Star Trek: A Post-Structural Critique of the Original Series, was a 2010 finalist nominee for General Non-fiction Book.

He was selected as the toastmaster for the Death Equinox 2001 convention.

Recipient of two Everett Helm Research Fellowships at the Lily Library Indiana University for research on Gordon Lish, Raymond Carver, and William Vollmannn.

He wrote multiple auto-ethnography articles for Forum: Qualitative Research.

Influences
Hemmingson acknowledged influences Harlan Ellison, Raymond Carver, Gordon Lish, and William T. Vollmann for literature, Wim Wenders, David Lynch, David Mamet, and Stanley Kubrick for film.

Hemmingson was called "Raymond Carver on acid" by literary guru Larry McCaffery and "a disciple of a quick and dirty literature" by the American Book Review.

Theater
From 1995 to 2000, he was Literary Manager of The Fritz Theater in San Diego, where he directed, produced, and wrote many plays there, as well as for his own company, The Alien Stage Project, that still produces theater in San Diego and Los Angeles. His full-length play, Driving Somewhere, won the 1997 Ventana New Play Award in San Francisco. It was first produced in 1995 by The Fritz Theater.

His one-act play, Iraq, was produced in the 2000 Samuel French, Inc. One-Act Play Festival in New York.

His one-act, Milk, has been widely produced and is published in the book, The Art of the One-Act. It has been produced in Seattle, Los Angeles, New York, and San Diego.

His full-length play, Erotic Scenes in a Cheap Motel Room, has been produced by dozens of theaters and is available as a radio drama from Walcott & Sheridan Audio Library. Its debut was on March 11 at the Fritz Theatre.

Fritz Theater original productions: Driving Somewhere, Iraq, Bosnia, Erotic Scenes in Cheap Motel Room.

Alien Stage Project original productions: Erotic Scenes in a Cheap Motel Room, Milk.

Actor's Alliance Play Festival original productions: Milk, NASDAQ, The Aliens, Happiness.

Compass Theater (San Diego) production of full-length, Stations in Summer 2009. Stations was directed by David Meredith and performed at the Resilience of the Spirit Festival.

Independent scholarship
As an independent scholar, Hemmingson focused his studies on Raymond Carver and William T. Vollmann, and the methodologies of critifiction and autoethnography. He published extensively in these areas of study, as well as critical monographs on Star Trek, Barry N. Malzberg, Charles Bukowski, blogging and micro-blogging.

In 2009, at the National Communication Association convention in Chicago, Hemmingson was awarded, by the Carl Couch Center, the Norman K. Denzin Qualitative Research Award for his paper of auto/ethnography, "Fragments of my Grandmothers."

Radio
From April 2012 until his death, Hemmingson hosted the show The Art of Dreaming on Revolution Radio at freedomslips.com.

Bibliography

Anthologies (edited)
 Expelled from, Eden: A William T. Vollmann Reader New York, co-edited with Larry McCaffery: (Thunder's Mouth Press, 2004) 
 The Mammoth Book of Legal Thrillers New York: (Carroll & Graf, 2001) 
 The Mammoth Book of Short Erotic Novels New York: Co-edited with Maxim Jakubowski (Carroll & Graf, 2000) 
 What The Fuck: The Avant-Porn Anthology New York: (Soft Skull Press, 2000)

Novels
 Time Lust NY: (Tor Books, 2014)
 Judas Payne: A Weird Western / Webb's Weird Wild West: Western Tales of Horror (double book with Don Webb, Wildside Press, 2010) 
 Hard Cold Whisper Rockville, MD: (Black Mask Books, 2010) 
 The Trouble with Tramps: An Orrie Hitt Homage Rockville, MD: (Black Mask Books, 2010) 
 Shabbytown. Rockville, MD: (Black Mask Books, 2009)  
 The Yacht People (The Borgo Press, 2009) 
 In the Background is a Walled City. San Bernardino, CA: (The Borgo Press, 2008) 
 Wild Turkey (Forge Books, 2001) 
 The Naughty Yard San Francisco: (Permeable Press, 1994)  reprinted in The Mammoth Book of International Erotica (Carroll & Graf, 1996)

Fiction collections
 Poison from a Dead Sun/The Chronotope (Wildside Press, 2012) (Novel + collected science fiction stories)
 Vivacious Vixens and Blackmail Babes (Wildside Press/Borgo Press, 2012) (Novel + 4 crime noir stories)
 This Other Eden: Three Novellas and Three Stories. Brooklyn, NY: (The Dybbuk Press, 2010) 
 Pictures of Houses with Water Damage New York: (Black Lawrence Press, 2010)
 Desperate Women. Rockville, MD: (The New Traveller's Companion/Olympia Press, 2010) 
 How to Have an Affair and Other Instructions. San Bernardino, California: (The Borgo Press, 2007)
 Seven Women and Other Stories New York: (Venus Book Club, 2002) 
 My Dream Date with Kathy Acker Portland, OR: (Eraserhead Press, 2002)
 Snuff Flique Denver, CO: (CyberPsychos AOD, 1997)  
 Nice Little Stories Jam-Packed with Depraved Sex & Violence Denver, CO: (CyberPsychos AOD, 1995)

Poetry collections
 Ourselves or Nothing Rockville, MD: (The New Traveller's Companion/Olympia Press, 2010) 
 Rwanda (Yellow Bat Press, 2003)
 Moving in on the Conservatives Detroit, MI: (Planet Detroit Press, 1995)
 Reaching Into the Wet Darkness. Stow, Ohio: (Impetus Press, 1986)
 Nowhere is Safe (Samizdat Press, 1985)

Plays
 Milk Kalamazoo, MI: (New Issues in Poetry and Prose, 2007)
 Driving Somewhere San Francisco: (Vantana Productions, 1997)

Literary criticism
 Women in the Short Fiction of Raymond Carver Jefferson, NC: (McFarland & Company, 2014)
 William T. Vollmann: An Annotated Bibliography Lanham, MD: (Scarecrow Press, 2012)
 Gordon Lish and His Influence on Twentieth Century American Literature New York and London: (Routledge, 2013)
 William T. Vollmann: A Critical Study and Seven Interviews. Jackson, NC: (McFarland & Company, 2009) 
 The Dirty Realism Duo: Charles Bukowski and Raymond Carver on the Aesthetics of the Ugly. San Bernardino, CA: (The Borgo Press, 2008, The Milford Series: Popular Writers of Today No. 70)

Anthologies (appeared in)
 Morbid Curiosity Cures the Blues (Simon and Schuster, 2009) 
 The Urban Bizarre (Wildside Press LLC, 2004) 
 The Mammoth Book of Erotica (Carroll & Graf, 2000)

Reviews
 Wild Turkey review by Tim W. Brown 
 5 reviews of Nice Little Stories Jam-Packed With Depraved Sex & Violence

References

External links

 Bibliography on Fantastic Fiction
 
 Michael Hemmingson interview from Raw Dog Screaming
 Michael Hemmingson interview from Cuauhtemoc's Celebrity Interviews
 Larry McCaffery's Avant-Porn anthology preface from the McCaffery Archive at Spineless Books

1966 births
2014 deaths
American male writers
American horror writers
American erotica writers
American book editors
American anthropologists